Long Time Coming is the second album by American R&B group Ready for the World. Three hits were scored from the album, including "Love You Down". It was released on September 30, 1986, on MCA Records.

Track listing

Personnel

Ready for the World
Melvin Riley Jr.: vocals, rhythm guitar, keyboards
Gordon Strozier: lead guitar, backing vocals
Gregory Potts: keyboards, synthesizers, backing vocals
John Eaton: bass, backing vocals
Gerald Valentine: drums
Willie Triplett: percussion, keyboards, backing vocals

Additional Musicians
Gary Spaniola: additional guitar on "So in Love" - "Here I Am" and "Love You Down"
Andrea Fheh: groupie's voice on "Mary Goes 'Round"

Charts

Weekly charts

Year-end charts

References

1986 albums
MCA Records albums
Ready for the World albums